Causeway Bay Terminus is a tram stop and one of the seven termini of Hong Kong Tramways, a double-decker tram system. Located in Causeway Bay, it is one of the system's two termini in the Wan Chai District on Hong Kong Island. It is also one of the two termini for Hong Kong Tramways' sightseeing tram service, the other being Western Market Terminus.

Route
Causeway Bay ↔ Shek Tong Tsui

References

Hong Kong Tramways stops